Tejgadh is a village in the Vadodara district of Gujarat, India. It is most noted for its Bhasa Research Centre (BRC) of which G. N. Devy is a founder member. The BRC runs the Bhasha Tribal Academy, which is a social service organization aiming for the development of local tribals. It also operates a museum showcasing tribal crafts and library.

It is the home of the Rathwa clan of Adivasis, or Indian tribal people.

References

External links
Tejgadh tribals chart own course

Villages in Vadodara district